Jack Johns may refer to:
 Jack Johns (cricketer)
 Jack Johns (rugby league)